Books That Grow is an online educational platform that offers digital books that adapt to readers' abilities. Using this learning management system, two people reading the same title may see entirely different words, sequences of ideas, or illustrations, depending upon their individual learning profile. The application focuses specifically on the needs of pre-teens, adolescents and adults with low literacy, a population under-served by publishers. Books That Grow seeks to help users become better readers and allow educator to measure students' abilities and track their progress. The company is headquartered in New York City.

History
Books That Grow was founded by Daniel Fountenberry, a former teacher and news executive in 2012. The project was first known as Borne Digital and was publicly launched February 14, 2013 at the Tools for Change in Publishing Conference  Other co-founders include Jason Buhle, a cognitive neuroscientist. A Kickstarter campaign was launched in January, 2014, to accelerate funding for Books that Grow.

Books That Grow offers the same text at different reading levels, with titles in several genres categorised as biographies, classic fiction, folktales, primary source documents, science, and social studies.

Reception

Adoption
Since the product launched in May of 2014, Books That Grow has been used by over 1,000 students and teachers in almost 30 schools.

Awards
For its efforts in developing an accessible online educational platform, Books That Grow was named 'Most Innovative Start Up' by the members of the International Society for Technology in Education in 2017  and received the 2014 Verizon Powerful Answers Award in Education as well as the 2014 National School Board Association's Innovation Showcase.

Reviews
On February 11, 2014, EdTech Digest featured Books That Grow in "Cool Tools", stating: "It's already making somewhat of a splash in the publishing world and is now just setting up to make its way into classrooms across the country." The article specifically noted Books That Grow's progress on Kickstarter  and coverage on MSNBC and CNN.

On April 7, 2015, ClassTechTips highly recommended Books That Grow, writing:
"The best part about Books to Grow is that every book can be read at 3-5 different levels of text complexity. Teachers can differentiate instruction by allowing them to assign the same reading to a class of mixed ability students, while permitting these students to learn at their own level, and make steady gains in their reading skills. Teachers can also create classrooms in the app, monitor the books their students read, and adjust their set reading levels by book or by student."

See also
Crowdfunding
Literacy

References

External links
 Books That Grow Facebook page
 Books That Grow LinkedIn page

Literacy
Educational software
Electronic publishing